Super League XXIII commenced on 1 February 2018, and ended on 13 October. It consisted of 23 regular season games, and 7 rounds of relevant play-offs, which included the Grand Final at Old Trafford.

Regular season
All times stated are GMT (before 25 March) or BST (25 March onwards)

Round 1

Round 2

Round 3

Round 4

Round 5

Round 6

Round 7

Round 8 (Good Friday/Easter Weekend)

Round 9 (Easter Monday)

Round 10

Round 11

Round 12

Round 13

Round 14

Round 15 (Magic Weekend)

Round 16

Round 17

Round 18

Round 19

Round 20

Round 21

Round 22

Round 23 

Kick off was scheduled for 19:45, but was delayed by 15 minutes due to a thunderstorm

Super 8's

Format
After 23 games the league table is frozen and the teams are split up into two of Super 8s. The teams finishing in the top eight go on to contest the Super League Super 8s to determine which teams would go through to the semi-final play-offs to compete for a place in the Grand Final. The teams retain the points scored so far and play each other one more, a total of seven further games per team.

Fixtures and results
The Super League Super 8s sees the top eight teams from the Super League play seven more games each. Each team's points are carried over, and after seven rounds the top four teams will contest the play off semi-finals, with the team finishing 1st hosting the team in 4th, whilst the team finishing 2nd hosting the 3rd placed team. the 2 winners of these semi-finals will contest the Super League Grand Final at Old Trafford.

Round 1

Round 2

Round 3

Round 4

Round 5

Round 6

Game moved to Huddersfield, due to Wigan Athletic's fixture with Bristol City, now being played on the same day.

Round 7

Notes

References

Super League XXIII